HD 185018 is supergiant star in the equatorial constellation of Aquila.

References

External links
 HR 7456
 Image HD 185018

G-type supergiants
Aquila (constellation)
Durchmusterung objects
185018
096481
7456